Mop and Smiff is a children's pre-school television programme, the first episode "The Hang Glider" was broadcast on 4 April 1985 on BBC1, the final episode "The Snow" aired on 1 January 1986. Repeats of the programme were shown on BBC2 until 1988. The show creator Mike Amatt also stars as himself with his dog Mop and cat Smiff.

Characters
Mop is a shaggy-haired sheepdog.

Smiff is a bright-eyed tabby cat.

Mike, their owner, is an artist and storyteller.

Setting
The show used a Portmanteau Format with a small cartoon show embedded inside a narrative. The show starts with detailing a day of Mike, Mop or Smiff in real camera recording format. When they return home later, Mike would use the day's events for artistic inspiration to draw a cartoon. The show cuts into Mike's imagined animated sub-story with Mop and Smiff as talking friends who care for each other and go on their own adventure.

Mike, Mop and the Moke
A spin-off series, Mike, Mop and the Moke, was produced in 1985, and featured Amatt and Mop driving to various seaside towns in an Austin Champ.

References

External links

BBC children's television shows
1985 British television series debuts
1985 British television series endings
1980s British children's television series